Martin Bambauer (born 1970 in Wesel) is a German organist and church musician.

Bambauer studied church music at the Robert Schumann Hochschule in Düsseldorf with Hans-Dieter Möller and passed his examination  with distinction for improvisation. Further he studied with Daniel Roth in Frankfurt am Main and passed the Konzertexamen in 2001. Since 2002 he has been a teacher for organ-improvisation at the  Musikhochschule in Köln. Bambauer is organist and choir director at the Basilica of Constantine in Trier.

Awards

 First prize International organ-competition of  Elburg (NL)
 First prize for improvisation in Schwäbisch Gmünd

Discographie

 2001: Orgelmusik aus Fünf Jahrhunderten (the Schuke-organ of the Basilica of Constantine) 
 2004: Franck und Seine Freunde (IFO 00 090)

External links
 Biographie Martin Bambauer t
 The Schuke-organ of the Basilica of Constantine

1970 births
Living people
German classical organists
Kirchenmusikdirektor
German male organists
Organ improvisers
People from Wesel
Robert Schumann Hochschule alumni
21st-century organists
21st-century German male musicians
Male classical organists